Blow Arnett, Blow (also rereleased as Go Power!!!) is an album by saxophonists Arnett Cobb and Eddie "Lockjaw" Davis recorded in 1959 for the Prestige label.

Reception
The Allmusic review awarded the album 4 stars and stated "Arnett Cobb's debut for Prestige and his first recording as a leader in three years (due to a serious car accident in 1956) is an explosive affair. Cobb is matched up with fellow tough tenor Eddie "Lockjaw" Davis, and there are plenty of sparks set off by their encounter".

Track listing 
All compositions by Arnett Cobb except where noted.
 "When I Grow Too Old to Dream" (Oscar Hammerstein II, Sigmund Romberg) – 6:41     
 "Go Power" (George Duvivier) – 5:05     
 "Dutch Kitchen Bounce" – 7:00     
 "Go Red Go" – 5:39     
 "The Eely One" – 8:16     
 "The Fluke" (Wild Bill Davis) – 5:30

Personnel 
 Arnett Cobb, Eddie "Lockjaw" Davis – tenor saxophone
 Wild Bill Davis – organ
 George Duvivier – bass
 Arthur Edgehill – drums

References 

Arnett Cobb albums
Eddie "Lockjaw" Davis albums
1959 albums
Albums produced by Esmond Edwards
Albums recorded at Van Gelder Studio
Prestige Records albums